Traveler is an American thriller drama television series that ran from May 10, 2007, until July 18, 2007, on ABC in the United States. The series was produced by Warner Bros. Television.

Traveler was officially canceled after eight first-run episodes on July 18, 2007.  David DiGilio, the creator, posted an "answers blog" on September 28, 2007, which officially ended the show.

Synopsis
The series follows Jay Burchell (Matt Bomer) and Tyler Fog (Logan Marshall-Green), two graduate students who become suspects when the fictitious Drexler Museum in New York is bombed while they are pulling a juvenile prank.  It appears that their friend and roommate, Will Traveler (Aaron Stanford), has framed them for the bombing. Afterwards, Traveler disappears and there is no evidence that he ever existed.  Jay and Tyler flee from the authorities, who believe them to be domestic terrorists.  While on the run and trying to clear their own names, they attempt to delve into Will Traveler's past in hopes of discovering Will's motives for turning on his friends.

Meanwhile, Traveler goes on a similar search for answers. It is revealed that he is in fact a secret agent working for a division of the Department of Homeland Security called the Fourth Branch, and slowly a complex conspiracy is unraveled.

Jay and Tyler reunite with Will by the seventh episode, and together the three attempt to bring those responsible to justice. They manage to kidnap Jack Freed, director of the Fourth Branch, but before they can use him to clear Jay and Tyler's names, the limousine with Jack Freed in it explodes.

Cast and characters

Traveler primarily focuses on the efforts of Jay Burchell (Matt Bomer) and Tyler Fog (Logan Marshall-Green), two college graduates who must prove their innocence after being framed for the bombing of a museum by their former roommate Will Traveler (Aaron Stanford). The two must evade the FBI, led by Special Agent in Charge Fred Chambers (Steven Culp). Special Agents Jan Marlow (Viola Davis) and Guillermo Borjes (Anthony Ruivivar) actively hunt the two, although Marlow questions the duo's purported guilt.

Over the course of the show, Jay and Tyler uncover a conspiracy that involves Jack Freed (Neal McDonough) of the Department of Homeland Security and even Carlton Fog (William Sadler), Tyler's father and a very successful businessman. Occasionally assisting Tyler and Jay is a mysterious man dubbed the Porter (Billy Mayo). Meanwhile, Kim Doherty (Pascale Hutton), Jay's girlfriend, must cope with harassment from both the FBI and the public.

At the end of the third episode, "New Haven", Will Traveler is revealed to be alive. Appearing as his girlfriend Maya is Sonja Bennett.

Episodes
ABC originally ordered the season with 13 episodes, but on October 28, 2006, the network scaled it back to eight episodes. The pilot episode aired at 10 P.M. on May 10, and repeated on May 30, 2007, immediately followed by the episode "The Retreat" in its regular time slot of Wednesday at 10 P.M. Eastern/9 P.M. Central. "The Retreat" was shown again on July 4, 2007, and then a new episode the following week, due to the Fourth of July holiday.

Reception

Critical reception
Traveler was met with mixed reviews. At Metacritic, the show has a rating of 53%, calculated from 17 reviews.

Robert Bianco of USA Today was positive about the show, saying "the show seems faster, brighter and more entertaining than most of the serials that beat it to the punch this fall." Bianco was nonetheless worried about Traveler'''s future both because of its subject matter and airing in the summer. Variety reporter Brian Lowry noted similar concerns and praised the actors, writing that Traveler "channels the old Hitchcockian standby of normal-guy-thrust-into-fabulous-plot scenario, with the central duo exhibiting realistic levels of fear, desperation and resourcefulness."

In contrast, Ray Richmond of The Hollywood Reporter reacted negatively to the show's "implausible" premise and finding that its protagonists "aren't nearly compelling enough to care a lot about." David Bianculli of the Daily News (New York) similarly called the premise "ridiculous" and called the show "nothing to see", negatively comparing it to The Fugitive.

Episode ratings

Ratings for episode 6 are overnight figures; all others are final numbers.
DVR numbers actually raised "The Reunion"'s ratings by 19.4% to around 4 million viewers.

Seasonal ratings
Seasonal ratings based on average total viewers per episode of Traveler'' on ABC:

References

External links
 

2000s American drama television series
2007 American television series debuts
2007 American television series endings
American Broadcasting Company original programming
English-language television shows
Television series by Warner Bros. Television Studios
Television shows set in New York City